The Rajasthan State Human Rights Commission is a State Government body constituted on 18 January 1999 to exercise the powers conferred upon, and to perform the functions assigned to, a State Human Rights Commission under chapter-V of The Protection of Human Rights Act, 1993. Commission became functional from 

23 March 2000 with the appointment of Justice Kanta Kumari Bhatnagar, former Chief Justice of the Madras High Court as the first Chairperson along with Shri R. K. Akodia, Shri B. L. Joshi and Prof. Alamshah Khan as the supporting members.

Functions  

The Commission shall perform all or any of the following functions in accordance to chapter-III point No.12 of the TPHRA-1993.
 Inquire, moto or on a petition presented to it by a victim or any person on his behalf or on a direction or order of any court into complaint of 
 Violation of human rights or abatement thereof; or
 Negligence in the prevention of such violation, by a public servant;
 Intervene in any proceeding involving any allegation of violation of human rights pending before a court with the approval of such court;
 Visit, notwithstanding anything contained in any other law for the time being in force, any jail or other institution under the control of the State Government, where persons are detained or lodged for purposes of treatment, reformation or protection, for the study of the living conditions of the inmates thereof and make recommendations thereon to the Government;
 Review the safeguards provided by or under the Constitution or any law for the time being in force for the protection of human rights and recommend measures for their effective implementation; 
 Review the factors, including acts of terrorism that inhibit the enjoyment of human rights and recommend appropriate remedial measures;
 Study treaties and other international instruments on human rights and make recommendations for their effective implementation;
 Undertake and promote research in the field of human rights;
 Spread human rights literacy among various sections of society and promote awareness of the safeguards available for the protection of these rights through publications, the media, seminars and other available means;
 Encourage the efforts of non-governmental organisations and institutions working in the field of human rights;
 Such other functions as it may consider necessary for the protection of human rights.

Procedure 

The course of action to any case as mentioned in chapter-IV point no. 17 to 20 of TPHRA Act 1993.

Inquiry into complaints 
The Commission while inquiring into the complaints of violations of human rights may–
 call for information or report from the Central Government or any State Government or any other authority or organisation subordinate thereto within such time as may be specified by it:- Provided that–
 if the information or report is not received within the time stipulated by the Commission, it may proceed to inquire into the complaint on its own;
 if, on receipt of information or report, the Commission is satisfied either that no further inquiry is required or that the required action has been initiated or taken by the concerned Government or authority, it may not proceed with the complaint and inform the complainant accordingly;
 without prejudice to anything contained in clause (i), if it considers necessary, having regard to the nature of the complaint, initiate an inquiry.

Steps during and after inquiry 
The Commission may take any of the following steps during or upon the completion of an inquiry held under this Act, namely:-
 where the inquiry discloses the commission of violation of human rights or negligence in the prevention of violation of human rights or abatement thereof by a public servant, it may recommend to the concerned Government or authority –
 to make payment of compensation or damages to the complainant or to the victim or the members of his family as the Commission may consider necessary;
 to initiate proceedings for prosecution or such other suitable action as the Commission may deem fit against the concerned person or persons;
 to take such further action as it may think fit;
 approach the Supreme Court or the High Court concerned for such directions, orders or writs as that Court may deem necessary;
 recommend to the concerned Government or authority at any stage of the inquiry the grant of such immediate interim relief to the victim or the members of his family as the Commission may consider necessary;
 subject to the provisions of clause 
 provide a copy of the inquiry report to the petitioner or his representative; 
 the Commission shall send a copy of its inquiry report together with its recommendations to the concerned Government or authority and the concerned Government or authority shall, within a period of one month, or such further time as the Commission may allow, forward its comments on the report, including the action taken or proposed to be taken thereon, to the Commission;
 the Commission shall publish its inquiry report together with the comments of the concerned Government or authority, if any, and the action taken or proposed to be taken by the concerned Government or authority on the recommendations of the Commission.

Procedure with respect to armed forces 
 Notwithstanding anything contained in this Act, while dealing with complaints of violation of human rights by members of the armed forces, the Commission shall adopt the following procedure, namely :-
 It may, either on its own motion or on receipt of a petition, seek a report from the Central Government
 After the receipt of the report, it may, either not proceed with the complaint or, as the case may be, make its recommendations to that Government.
 The Central Government shall inform the Commission of the action taken on the recommendations within three months or such further time as the Commission may allow.
 The Commission shall publish its report together with its recommendations made to the Central Government and the action taken by that Government on such recommendations.
 The Commission shall provide a copy of the report published under sub-section (3) to the petitioner or his representative.

Annual and special reports of the Commission 
 The Commission shall submit an annual report to the Central Government and to the State Government concerned and may at any time submit special reports on any matter which, in its opinion, is of such urgency or importance that it should not be deferred till submission of the annual report.
 The Central Government and the State Government, as the case may be, shall cause the annual and special reports of the Commission to be laid before each House of Parliament or the State Legislature respectively, as the case may be, along with a memorandum of action taken or proposed to be taken on the recommendations of the Commission and the reasons for non-acceptance of the recommendations, if any.

Composition
After an official comment from Supreme court Justice Prakash Chandra Tatia, former Chief Justice of Jharkhand High Court was appointed as the Chairperson,
 his name was recommended along with Shri Chandramohan Meena as Member and Shri Ashutosh Sharma as an expert, by two selection committees headed by Chief Minister Vasundhara Raje Scindia.

Present team

Earlier Shri H. R. Kuri was heading the commission as an Acting Chairman since the position become vacant after the former Chief Justice Nagendra Kumar Jain from Madras and Karnataka High Court, completed his tenure as the Chairperson from 16 July 2005 till 15 July 2010.

Former Chairmen & Members

Reports
The commission had assessed a sum of 17,033 incidents between 2010~2014 with the highest number of incidents reported from Jaipur followed by Ajmer out of 33 districts. A comprehensive district and incident wise, report is annually published by the commission reflecting status of the incidents along with some of the important and major rulings by the commission each year.

Significant incidents
Some of the recent incidents which brought Human Rights concerns in the state of Rajasthan under News are:
 Pakistani resident Hawa Devi, who is stuck in Jodhpur for over a year, waiting for permission of departure.
 Notice to the state police and local authorities seeking a detailed report of the car accident involving BJP, MP Hema Malini, which killed a four-year-old girl.
 Suo-motu cognizance of the rising suicides by students in the coaching hub of Kota.
 Police's attitude in handling a minor gang rape incident in Sikar.
 Right to die practicing Sallekhana as per Jainism.
 RAC’s 11th battalion IPS officer accused of corruption and favoritism.
 NHRC's Suo-motu cognizance in case where Cops strip woman in Ajmer police station to recover stolen mobile.
 Fake pharmaceutical company in Rajasthan had recently supplied various life saving medicines & antibiotics to 13 different states.
 Beawar sex racket investigation.
 Rising number of cancer patients due to radiation after Pokhran-II nuke test from Khetolai and Loharki villages.
 Recommendations to make necessary amendments in Mines Act, 1952 to contain the alarming spread of occupational diseases like silicosis and effectively deal with violators.
 Fair compensation for land acquired by govt. is farmer’s human right:Supreme court of India.
 The Rajasthan Human Rights Commission, advocated to make home guards permanent working in Jaisalmer and Barmer.

References

Human rights in India
Human rights